Metostilenol is a drug which was patented as an antidepressant in the early 1980s, but was never marketed.

References 

Secondary alcohols
Antidepressants
4-Morpholinyl compunds
Abandoned drugs